Patrick "Pat" Turner (born March 24, 1961 in Toronto, Ontario) is a Canadian rower, who was a member of the Canadian men's eights team that won the gold medal at the 1984 Summer Olympics in Los Angeles, California. The rowing team was inducted into the BC Sports Hall of Fame in 1985, and the Canadian Olympic Hall of Fame in 2003.

Personal life
After the Olympics, Turner worked as an emergency doctor at the University Hospital of Northern British Columbia before moving to Prince George, British Columbia in 2003.

Turner's older brother Tim is also an Olympian. He competed in the coxless fours event during the 1984 Olympics.

References

 Canadian Olympic Committee

1961 births
Living people
Canadian male rowers
Olympic gold medalists for Canada
Olympic medalists in rowing
Rowers at the 1984 Summer Olympics
Rowers from Toronto
Medalists at the 1984 Summer Olympics
Commonwealth Games medallists in rowing
Commonwealth Games gold medallists for Canada
Rowers at the 1986 Commonwealth Games
Medallists at the 1986 Commonwealth Games